Kota Lok Sabha constituency is one of the 25 Lok Sabha (parliamentary) constituencies in Rajasthan state in India.

Assembly Segments
Presently, Kota Lok Sabha constituency comprises eight Vidhan Sabha (legislative assembly) segments. These are:

Members of Parliament

Election results

See also
 Kota district
 List of Constituencies of the Lok Sabha

References

Kota district
Lok Sabha constituencies in Rajasthan